Richard Benz (12 June 1884, Reichenbach im Vogtland – 9 November 1966, Heidelberg) was a historian and writer. He came to Heidelberg in 1902, where he was made honorary citizen in 1954. The historian, son of a pastor, is not related to the automotive pioneer Karl Benz.  At Heidelberg Benz studied philosophy and cultural history at the university.

Heidelberg awards a medal named after him.

External links
http://www.heidelberg.de/servlet/PB/menu/1146283/index.html

1884 births
1966 deaths
People from Reichenbach im Vogtland
People from the Kingdom of Saxony
Heidelberg University alumni
Commanders Crosses of the Order of Merit of the Federal Republic of Germany
German male non-fiction writers
20th-century German historians